Eucosma lugubrana is a species of moth of the family Tortricidae. It is found on Sicily and in France, Austria, Italy, Slovakia, Hungary, North Macedonia, Greece and Russia, Kazakhstan and Kyrgyzstan.

The wingspan is 17–22 mm. Adults have been recorded on wing from June to July.

The larvae feed on Allium species.

References

Moths described in 1830
Eucosmini